Forestport Reservoir is a reservoir located by Forestport, New York. The reservoir was created by the impoundment of the Black River. Fish species present in the reservoir are yellow perch, lake trout, pickerel, white sucker, rock bass, smallmouth bass, and brown bullhead. There is state owned beach launch off Route 28.

References

Lakes of New York (state)
Lakes of Oneida County, New York
Reservoirs in New York (state)
Reservoirs in Oneida County, New York